Listen to Your Heart is a 1983 American romantic comedy TV film starring George Barrow and George Coe. The film is produced by director Don Taylor and William F. Phillips. The film was edited by Tom Stevens. The music is by James Di Pasquale.

In it, a book editor (Tim Matheson) falls in love with a co-worker (Kate Jackson) and has complication balancing his career with his newfound love.

Plot

The film begins in a singles bar. Frannie (Kate Jackson) has just ended a six-year relationship with her boss. She is brought to the singles bar club, wanting to try casual affairs, by her close friend Stacey (Cassie Yates). Meanwhile, Josh (Tim Matheson) is dragged there by his friend Marvin (Will Nye), who wants to have a few flings before marriage. The two women send a waitress over to them who then responds "The two, right over there, want that you should join them."

Then Frannie and Josh go to his place, but no affection happens. Frannie wakes up the next day in her apartment, drunk. Unfortunately, she has to move to Stacey's apartment. As the two develop a relationship, it is found that Franne is a co-worker with Josh. The movie deals with them working in the same office and maintaining a relationship.

Cast
 George Barrow as Bit
 George Coe as John
 Ernest Harada as 
 Kate Jackson as Frannie Green
 Alison La Place as Lynn
 Tim Matheson as Josh Stern
 Will Nye as Marvin
 Cassie Yates as Stacey
 John J. York as Steve

References

External links
Listen to Your Heart at Internet Archive
Listen to Your Heart at Turner Classic Movies

1983 television films
1983 films
American television films
Films directed by Don Taylor
1980s English-language films